Inavale is an unincorporated community and census-designated place in western Webster County, Nebraska, United States. It lies along U.S. Route 136, west of the city of Red Cloud, the county seat of Webster County.  Its elevation is 1,736 feet (529 m).

A post office was established at Invale in 1873, and remained in operation until it was discontinued in 1994. Inavale retains the ZIP code of 68952. The town's name is descriptive, from its setting in a vale.

Demographics

References

Census-designated places in Webster County, Nebraska
Census-designated places in Nebraska